The 2022–23 Arkansas Razorbacks men's basketball team represents the University of Arkansas during the 2022–23 NCAA Division I men's basketball season. The team is led by fourth-year head coach Eric Musselman, and plays its home games at Bud Walton Arena in Fayetteville, Arkansas as a member of the Southeastern Conference.

Previous season

Arkansas followed up an Elite Eight appearance in 2021 with another in 2022, even though the Razorbacks didn't finish as high in the SEC as they had a year prior. This time they were fourth in the final SEC standings, and earned a 4 seed in the NCAA tournament. Arkansas was sent to Buffalo, New York where they dispatched Vermont and New Mexico State to advance to the Sweet 16 for the second year in a row.

In the regional semifinals against overall top seeded Gonzaga, Arkansas secured a 74–68 upset victory at the Chase Center in San Francisco. This set up an Elite Eight showdown with Duke, in the final year of head coach Mike Krzyzewski's 43-year stint with the Blue Devils. 

Duke defeated the Razorbacks 78–69 to advance to the Final Four. The Razorbacks finished with a record of 28–9.

Offseason

Departures

Incoming transfers

2022 Recruiting Class
With his third signing class, Eric Musselman signed the nation's second-ranked class (just behind Duke), with three 5* signees and three 4* signees. Guard Nick Smith finished ranked in the overall Top 5 of every major rankings service, and ended up ranked as the #1 overall recruit in the nation by 247Sports when their final rankings were released in May 2022.

2023 Recruiting Class
Arkansas currently has two verbal commitments for the 2023 class, which can sign in the early signing period in November of 2022.

Roster

Schedule

|-
!colspan=12 style=""| European exhibition trip

|-
!colspan=12 style=""| Exhibition

|-
!colspan=12 style=""| Non-conference regular season

|-
!colspan=12 style=""| SEC regular season

|-
!colspan=12 style=""| SEC Tournament

|-
!colspan=12 style=| NCAA Tournament

References

Arkansas Razorbacks men's basketball seasons
Arkansas
2022 in sports in Arkansas
2023 in sports in Arkansas
Arkansas